Akadeemia is an Estonian-language cultural magazine published by Kultuurileht. 1989–2004, the journal was published by Perioodika.

First number was issued in April 1989.

References

Magazines published in Estonia